HMS Lance was a  destroyer of the Royal Navy. She was responsible for firing the first British shot of the war.

Construction
HMS Lance was originally to be named Daring but the entire Laforey-class had their names changed to alphabetically homogeneous ones in 1913.  Lance was ordered on 29 March 1912 from John I. Thornycroft & Company and was laid down on 1 August 1912. The ship was launched on 25 February 1914 and completed in August 1914.

She was fitted with three QF Mk IV (102 mm) guns, a single QF 2 pdr pom-pom Mk. II, and four torpedo tubes in two twin mounts.

Service
Following the start of the First World War at 2300 GMT on 4 August 1914, Lance, assigned to the 3rd Destroyer Flotilla of the Harwich Force, took part in a sweep of the North Sea. The next day, Lance and her sister ship  were sent to investigate a report from a trawler of a ship dropping mines. The two destroyers encountered the German minelayer and former excursion steamer  deploying mines. Lance fired a shell from one of her 4-inch guns at Königin Luise which was the first British shot of the war. The minelayer at first attempted to flee, but when her captain realised that escape was impossible, he ordered her to be scuttled instead. Lance picked up 28 survivors from the German ship.  Lance′s gun is on display at the National Museum of the Royal Navy, Portsmouth, on loan from the Imperial War Museum, London.

On 28 August 1914, along with the rest of the 3rd Destroyer Flotilla, Lance took part in the Battle of Heligoland Bight. On 17 October 1914 Lance was with her flotilla when it attacked the German Seventh Half Flotilla of torpedo boats off Texel, completely annihilating the German force. On 29 November 1915 Lance took part in a sweep by the Harwich Force into the Skagerrak.

In 1916, Lance transferred to the 9th Destroyer Flotilla, still part of the Harwich force. On 1 June 1916, the Harwich force sortied to reinforce the Grand Fleet following the Battle of Jutland. Lance was one of eight destroyers detached to screen the damaged battleship , which had been torpedoed during the battle, helping to escort the battleship to the Humber for temporary repair. Lance attempted to salvage the stricken destroyer but Lassoo broke in two and sank, with all but four of Lassoos crew being rescued.

In March 1917, Lance transferred to the Sixth Flotilla as part of the Dover Patrol, leaving the Flotilla in July that year. By October 1917, Lance was part of the Fourth Destroyer Flotilla, based at Devonport, remaining part of this flotilla on 1 December 1918.

Lance was laid up under Care and Maintenance at the Nore in December 1919, and was sold for scrap on 5 November 1921.

Citations

References
 
 
 
 
 
 
 
 
 
 

 

Laforey-class destroyers (1913)
Ships built in Southampton
1914 ships
World War I destroyers of the United Kingdom